Pinalia chrysocardium is a species of orchid. It is native to Sumatra. It was reassigned from the genus Eria.

References

chrysocardia
Flora of Sumatra